As of 1 June 2005, Thangkhangin Ngaihte is an Indian politician.  He is the president of the Lok Janshakti Party (LJP) Manipur State Committee. He was nominated (11 May 2005) by LJP president Ram Vilas Paswan to replace Albert Gengoukhup Mate, the former State Committee president, who was killed in the prior month.

Early life and career
Born into the family of Sonna of the Ngaihte clan of the Paite-Zomi group, Thangkhangin is the first Manipur-born Zomi scholar, having received his Master's degree in Philosophy at the Jawaharlal Nehru University, Delhi. He is considered to be a trail-blazer for the Zomi Nationalist Movement across the globe. Reportedly, he co-founded the Zomi National Congress (a forerunner for the various branches of the Zo Movement, like ZRO, and ZORO), and is said to have been instrumental in organising the First World Zomi Convention (19–21 May 1988) at Champhai in Mizoram, India.

References

Lok Janshakti Party politicians
Manipur politicians
Jawaharlal Nehru University alumni
Living people
Year of birth missing (living people)